Khajuriya Kalan is a village in the Bhopal district of Madhya Pradesh, India. It is located in the Berasia tehsil.

Demographics
According to the 2011 census of India, Khajuriya Kalan has 146 households. The effective literacy rate (i.e. the literacy rate of population excluding children aged 6 and below) is 68.11%.

References

Villages in Berasia tehsil